Giulio Castagnoli (born Rome, 22 November 1958) is an Italian composer.

Castagnoli, great-grandson of the Florentine composer and pianist  Edgardo Del Valle de Paz, graduated in literature (Turin University), piano and composition (Turin Conservatory) before postgraduate degrees in composition at the Hochschule für Musik Freiburg with Brian Ferneyhough (1986), and at Accademia Nazionale di Santa Cecilia in Rome with Franco Donatoni (1987). He is currently professor of composition at the Turin Conservatory.

Castagnoli collaborates with RAI-Radiotelevisione Italiana as a musicologist in programs on contemporary music, leads a concert series in Turin, and is the editor of the musical review "Quaderni di Musica Nuova". He won several international composition contexts. His one act radio opera "To the Museum" (libretto by Ugo Nespolo)  got a special mention of the Jury at 1991 Prix Italia. He was selected in many other events, like the World Music Days of the ISCM in Hong Kong in 1988. Luciano Berio conducted his music. Castagnoli has also received commissions from Radio France, RAI-Italian Radio, the City of Geneva, Stamford Chamber Orchestra (U.S.A.),  Radio Suisse Romande, and from festivals, soloists and ensembles including the Elision Ensemble, Melbourne, Nieuw Ensemble, Amsterdam, Divertimento Ensemble, Milan, Xenia Ensemble, Turin. Castagnoli was invited by DAAD – Senate of Berlin as composer in residence 1998–99 and in summer 2003. As a musicologist, he obtained scholarship from the Paul Sacher Foundation, Basel in 1999. Luciano Berio commissioned from him his Concerto per Violoncello e Doppia Orchestra, for Santa Cecilia 2002 which had a 3 concert season in Rome.

List of works
 "Qui conta come Narcis" ... per pianoforte e voce recitante ad libitum (1982) ( 6') (Ricordi). Tortona, Teatro Municipale, 18 febbraio 1983, Livia Conte
 "Quasi una fantasia" (sopra un finale) (1983) (8') per pianoforte solo (Ricordi). Torino, 17 marzo 1984, Conservatorio, Francesco Cipolletta
 "Le ore e le lune"  opera da camera on a libretto by Sergio Liberovici, for soprano, flute (or ottavino), clarinet (or clarinet bass), guitar (or mandolin), violoncello (1984). Turin, 3 maggio 1984, Salone Ippolito Nievo, Luisa Castellani, voce, Mara Armanni, violoncello, Sergio Delmastro, clarinetto, Davide Ficco, chitarra, Claudio Montafia, flauto
 "Ricercare sopra un tema di Francesco Geminiani" per oboe e clavicembalo (1984) (6') Saint Vincent, Sala dei Congressi, 26 aprile 1985, Silvano Scanziani, oboe, Maria Grazia Bertocchi, clavicembalo
 "Serenata après l'11.ème étude de Villalobos" per chitarra (1984) (6') (Edipan)(disco PAN3009 e disco Oliphant CNTP 00991. Freiburg, Musikhochschule, 8 gennaio 1986, Jürgen Ruck
 "Partita " per contrabbasso (1984, rev.1993) (4')
 "Uqbar", trio d'archi per 7 sopra una canzone famosa per ottavino, clarinetto basso, percussioni, pianoforte, violino, viola e violoncello (1984) (15') (Edizioni Suvini Zerboni)(Disco Happy New Ears-Compositori Associati, Ca 912) Graz, Steirisches Herbst, Musikprotokoll, 24 ottobre 1986, Pro Arte Ensemble Graz, direttore Adolf Hennig
 "Quartetto per archi" (note ad A Bao A Qu)  (13') (1985) Milano, 1 ottobre 1985, Auditorium di Porta Vigentina, Quartetto Arditti
 "Finzione" per ottavino, oboe, clarinetto basso, clavicembalo, percussioni, violino, viola e violoncello (8')(1985) Roma, 21 giugno 1985, Villa Medici, Gruppo Musica d’Oggi, direttore Gino Lanzillotta
 "Limber Jack" per sassofoni soprano, tenore e baritono (5' opp.10', opp.15 ')(1985) Ferrara, Aterforum, 5 giugno 1985, Alfredo Ponissi, sassofoni
 ""L'inutil precauzione"" (aria del cembalo), per ottavino, sassofono tenore, tromba e clavicembalo ( 7')(1985) – Torino, Settembre Musica, Teatro Nuovo, 19 settembre 1985 Maria Luisa Pacciani, clavicembalo, Renato Cugno, tromba, Claudio Montafia, ottavino, Alfredo Ponissi, sassofono
 "Finzione II" – concerto per violoncello e orchestra (14') (1985) (piccola orchestra) Freiburg, 10 luglio 1986, Carola Drexler, violoncello
 "Klang per archi", omaggio a Giacinto Scelsi (7')(1986) (Casa Musicale Sonzogno)(Disco Happy New Ears- Compositori Associati CA912) Maiano, 4 ottobre 1986, Haydn Philarmonia, direttore Ezio Rojatti
 "Trio per violino", violoncello e pianoforte (9') (1986) (Edizioni Suvini Zerboni)(Disco Happy New Ears-Compositori Associati, CA 912) Roma, Auditorium del Foro Italico, 31 ottobre 1986, Mario Buffa violino, Luigi Lanzillotta violoncello, Giancarlo Simonacci, pianoforte
 "Duo per violino solo"  (8') (1986) (Edizioni Suvini Zerboni). Amsterdam, Concertgebouw, 18 aprile 1987, Cécile Huijnen, violino
Amsterdam, 12 novembre 1987, Gaudeamus Music Week, Waalse Kerk, Harry Sparnaay, clarinetto basso, Harrie Staareveld, Flauto, Masumi Nagasawa, arpa Altra versione: Trio II b per flauto, clarinetto basso e pianoforte (1986/87) (10') (Edizioni Suvini Zerboni)(Disco Happy New Ears – Compositori Associati, CA911) Amsterdam, De Ijsbrecker, 18 marzo 1988, Het Trio: Harry Sparnaay, clarinetto Basso, Harrie Starreveld, flauto, René Eckhardt, pianoforte
 "Trio per quattro" per flauto, clarinetto basso, chitarra e pianoforte (altra versione di Trio II) (10')(1986/87)(Edizioni Suvini Zerboni) (Disco ADDA 590014 AD 184) Buenos Aires, Teatro Colon, 10 agosto 1987, Antidogma Musica, direttore Enrico Correggia
 "Secondo quartetto con voci" per quartetto d'archi, soprano, attrice e nastro magnetico (14') (1987) (Edizioni Suvini Zerboni) (Disco Happy New Ears – Compositori Associati, CA 912) RaiRadiotre, 8 giugno 1987
 "Numeri",  Gheorghe Costin
 "Doppio Quintetto" per flauto (anche ottavino e flauto in sol), (anche clarinetto piccolo e basso), corno, chitarra, pianoforte, e quintetto d'archi (13') (1988) (Edizioni Stradivarius) (Disco Stradivarius, STR 33572). Parigi, Grande Salle Centre Pompidou, 17 marzo 1988, Antidogma Musica, direttore Enrico Correggia
 "Due stanze giapponesi" per trombone solo (7') (1988) (Ricordi) (Disco RCA CCD 3003) Versione 1992 "Tre stanze giapponesi": Al sole; In un tempio; All'ombra, per trombone solo (Ricordi)Torino, 8 maggio 1993 Goethe – Institut Turin, Roberto Zucca
 "Doppio Trio" per flauto, clarinetto basso, arpa, violino, violoncello e pianoforte  (8')(1988) (Edizioni Suvini Zerboni). Cremona, Spazionovecento, 12 novembre 1988, Gruppo Musica Insieme, direttore Pietro Antonini
 "Black out" per sax baritono e pianoforte (altra versione per clarinetto basso e pianoforte) (7') (1988). Roma, S. Margherita in Trastevere, Federico Mondelci, sassofono, Oscar Pizzo, pianoforte
 "Quartetto per clarinetto", violino, violoncello e pianoforte (13') (1989) (Quaderni Perugini di Musica Contemporanea). Perugia, 12 maggio 1989, Aula Magna Università per Stranieri, Gabriele Mirabassi, clarinetto, Gabriele Raspanti, violino, Ulrike Brand, violoncello, Meret Kammer, pianoforte
 "Monk & sphere" per clarinetto basso solo (6') (1990) (Ricordi) (Disco DDT 19203) Torino, Festival Antidogma, 30 settembre 1991, Rocco Parisi
 "Cinque Madrigali" per undici archi (6 violini, 2 viole, 2 violoncelli e 1 contrabbasso) ( 15') (1990) Commande de la Ville de Gèneve. Gèneve, Hotel de Ville, 9 luglio 1990 Antidogma Ensemble, direttore Andrea Molino Nuova versione: 23/11/1992  Bologna, Teatro Comunale, Accademia Bizantina, direttore Luciano Berio
 "Tre Tanka" dallo "Hiakunin Isshu" per flauto e pianoforte (10') (1990) (EDIPAN) (disco PAN 3039). 10 maggio 1991 Roma, Villa Medici, Manuel Zurria, flauto, Oscar Pizzo, pianoforte
 "Quattro Notturni" per quartetto d'archi (terzo quartetto), da "in forma di Haiku" di Carlo Cignetti  (13') (1990) (Ricordi). Torino, Tempio Valdese, 9 maggio 1991, Quartetto d’archi di Torino
 "Al Museo in volo & a zompi" opera buffa radiofonica in un atto e dodici quadri per soprano leggero, mezzosoprano, bass barytone, voci recitanti, coro, orchestra e nastro magnetico opera commissionata da Radiotre per il Prix Italia 1991) (45') (1991) (Edizioni Nuova Fonit Cetra, Disco Fonit Cetra CTD16)
 "Miles" per clarinetto basso e violoncello (6') (1991) (Ricordi). Roma, 23 gennaio 1992, Ciro Scarponi, clarinetto basso, Gino Lanzillotta, violoncello
 "Cloches en noir et blanc" per flauto, clarinetto, corno, percussioni, sintetizzatore, pianoforte, violino e violoncello (1991) (14') (Edizioni Stradivarius) (Disco Stradivarius, STR 33572) 24 gennaio 1992 Paris, Présences 92, Maison de la Radio, Ensemble TM+, direttore Laurent Cuniot
 "Canti per orchestra" (14') (1991) (Edizioni Ricordi) Commission of the Stamford Chamber Orchestra. 20 giugno 1992 Stamford Con. (U.S.A.), Stamford Chamber Orchestra, direttore Laurence Gilgore
 "A due voci" per soprano, quintetto di fiati e pianoforte (11') da "Ottava Fuga" di Umberto Saba(1992) (Ricordi). Cosenza, Aula Magna dell’Università della Calabria, Barbara Lazotti, soprano; Gruppo Musica d'Oggi, direttore Gino Lanzillotta
 "Tre musiche a china" per flauto (in do e in sol), clarinetto basso, percussioni e pianoforte (10') (1992) (Ricordi). 7 ottobre 1994 Paris, IRCAM, Elementi dell’Orchestra Sinfonica Emilia-Romagna, direttore Bruno Garbarino
 "Al Maestro" per ensemble (1992) (2’) (Ricordi) 13/3/1993 Bruxelles, Festival Ars Musica, Nieuw Ensemble di Amsterdam, direttore Ed Spanijard
 "Una lettera a china" per violoncello e pianoforte (1992) (2’) (Ricordi)
 "Cloches blanches et noires" per grande orchestra (1992/93) (16')
 "Vana – Evanescente – Invano", tre pezzi per orchestra (1993) (12') (Ricordi) 18/2/1993 San Remo, Orchestra Filarmonica di San Remo, direttore Daniele Agiman
 "Quattro canti di Omar Khayyam", per sestetto d'archi (1993) (18') 29 settembre 1993 Torino, Festival Antidogma Musica, Auditorium Rai, Sextuor à cordes de L'A.I.E.C. – Lille
 "Tre liriche d'Oriente", per flauto dolce basso e basso di viola (1993) (15') versione 1998 per violoncello e flauto in sol 22 febbraio 1994 Lausanne, Maison de la Radio, Kees Boeke, viola da gamba, Antonio Politano, flauto dolce basso
 "Quattro poemetti", per violoncello ed amplificazione (1993) (18') Commande de Radio France (disco Happy new ear CA9810) 31 gennaio 1994 Paris, Présences 94, Maison de la Radio, Salle Messiaen, Alain Meunier, violoncello, Sy.Te.R du G.R.M.
 "Tà paràthura (Le finestre)"- da "Un Quaderno di Kostantinos Kavafis Constantine P. Cavafy", per violino solo (1994) (10'). Torino, Galleria d’Arte Moderna, 25 giugno 1995, Enzo Porta
 "Epéstrephe (Ritorna)"- da "Un Quaderno di Kostantinos Kavafis", per viola d'amore e chitarra a dodici corde (1994) (12') – Roma, 23 giugno 1996, Acquario, Luca Sanzò, Viola d'amore, Stefano Cardi, chitarra
 "Toù plòiou (A bordo)" – da "Un Quaderno di Kostantinos Kavafis", per arpa (1994) (10') Torino, 8 giugno 1994, Gabriella Bosio
 "Hedoné" (Alla voluttà), da "Un Quaderno di Kostantinos Kavafis", per voce, violino e pianoforte (1994)(12'). Faenza, Teatro Comunale, 5 novembre 1994, Barbara Lazotti, voce, Sabina Moretti, violino, Bo Price, pianoforte
 "Phonés (Voci)", da "Un Quaderno di Kostantinos Kavafis", per voce e sonagli (1994)(12'). 24 ottobre 1996 Beijing Conservatory, Luisa Castellani, soprano
 "I toni della notte", per clavicembalo a tre tastiere con amplificazione ad libitum (1995) (10'). 13 settembre 1995 Tokyo, Tsuda Hall, Natsu Yoko – clavicembalo
 "Tre canti ebraici" per due violoncelli (1995) (10') Casale Monferrato, Sinagoga, 10 aprile 1995, Renzo Brancaleon e Erica Patrucco, violoncelli
 "Tre poesie T'ang" per pianoforte e gruppi di strumenti (flauto – anche ottavino e flauto in sol, oboe – –anche corno inglese, clarinetto – anche clarinetto piccolo, clarinetto basso, corno, 2 percussioni, arpa, 2 violini, viola, violoncello e contrabbasso) (1995) (18')(Disco Stradivarius, STR 33572) 22 luglio 1995 Venezia, La Biennale Musica, Divertimento Ensemble, direttore Sandro Gorli
 "Sarabanda, Sarabanda fiorita, Sarabanda sfiorita" per violoncello solo (6’) (1995) Colma di Rosignano, 11 giugno 1995, Erica Patrucco
 "Threnos" per trio d'archi (1996) (12') 24 aprile 1999 Taskent, Festival di Musica Nuova, Xenia Ensemble
 "Il lago notturno/il cielo stellato" (12') secondo trio per violino, violoncello e pianoforte (1996) (disco Moto Perpetuo, Pescocostanzo 1996) – Pescocostanzo, 23 luglio 1996, Steven Neugarten Trio
 "Le azzurre campane della sera" (12') per 17 archi (1996) Torino, 27 settembre 1996, Conservatorio di Torino, Antidogma Musica, direttore Guido Guida
 "Fioriture" (18') per Gu Q'in e 11 strumenti ( flauto, oboe – anche corno inglese, clarinetto – anche clarinetto basso, corno, percussioni, arpa, 2 violini, viola, violoncello e contrabbasso) (1996)- Milano, 28 ottobre 1996 Sala Puccini – La Scala, Divertimento Ensemble, Luca Bonvini, Gu Q’in, direttore Sandro Gorli
 "Fioriture II" (18') per viola solista e 11 strumenti soprano ( flauto, oboe – anche corno inglese, clarinetto – anche clarinetto basso, corno, percussioni, arpa, 2 violini, viola, violoncello e contrabbasso) (1996/97) (Disco Stradivarius, STR 33572) Mosca, 24/1071997 Moscow Conservatory, Rachmaninov Hall, Giovanni Cavalli, viola, Orchestra dell'OSER, direttore Giorgio Bernasconi
 "5 Trakl-Lieder" (10') per mezzosoprano e pianoforte (1997) Manta, 22 settembre 1997, Festival di Antidogma Musica, Marinella Tarenghi- pianoforte, Elena Custer – mezzo-soprano
 "Cantico Notturno" (12') per 12 voci e percussioni (1997) Milano, 21 ottobre 1998, Festival Milano Musica-La Scala, Camerata Polifonica, direttore Ruben Jais (Edizioni Nuova Stradivarius) (Disco Stradivarius 33858)
 Il Re – monodramma su testo di Carlo Cignetti, per recitante, flauto ( e flauto in sol), clarinetto basso, violino, violoncello, chitarra, pianoforte e mezzo-soprano ad lib.(18') (1997) Roma, 10 maggio 1999, Accademia Filarmonica Romana, Freon Ensemble e Burattinmusica
 "Sciofar" per fagotto (8’) (1998)
 "Due moti d’acqua" per due pianoforti (1995–1998) (15’) Sermoneta, 4 luglio 1998, Festival Pontino, Duo Notarstefano-Risaliti
 "Isole" livre pour violoncelle (e nastro ad lib.) (25’) (1998) (disco I concerti di Brunnenburg, Merano TR CD001, 1999) – Berlino, 27 settembre 1999, Festival Musica Elettronica, Francesco Dillon – violoncello, Folkmar Hein – elettronica dal vivo
 "Itaca è questa..." per canto e pianoforte, su testo dall’Ulisse di Claudio Monteverdi (4’) (1998). Roma, 13 novembre 1998, Villa Medici, Festival Roma Europa, Rosa Ricciotti, voce, Felice Venanzoni, pianoforte
 "Costellazioni" per chitarra solista e gruppo di strumenti (1999) (15’) (inedito) (Disco Stradivarius, STR 33572). Berlino, 15 giugno 1999 SFB, Kleine Saal: Portät Konzert Giulio Castagnoli, Divertimento Ensemble, Elena Casoli chitarrista, direttore Sandro Gorli
 "Un raga" per due violini (1998) (6’) Merano, 14 luglio 1998, Biblioteca Civica, Giacomo Agazzini e Umberto Fantini
 "Un canto" per violoncello e pianoforte (1999) (2’)
 "...pour vous dire..." per pianoforte solo (1999–2004) (4’)
 "Je reprends la plume..." per controtenore e trio d’archi, su testo tratto da una lettera di Puskin (1999)(7’). Roma, 17 ottobre 1999, Ambasciata Britannica, David James – controtenore e Xenia Ensemble
 "Laudi per doppio coro e orchestra" (testi: dai Salmi e da Sant'Ambrogio) (1999) (15’) (Disco Stradivarius, STR 33576). Milano, 29 novembre 1999, Sant’Ambrogio, Camerata Polifonica di Milano, Orchestra dei Pomeriggi Musicali, direttore Sandro Gorli
 "Finale (il mare)" per sette strumenti ed elettronica (1999)(8’) Milano, 22 novembre 1999, Palazzo Reale, Freon Ensemble diretto da Stefano Cardi
 "Maqam, eine Vervanderung fuer Bruno Canino", per pianoforte solo Milano, 16 maggio 2000, Bruno Canino
 "Chet" per tromba, percussioni (3 piatti sospesi, vibrafono), contrabbasso (2001) (8’) Cologne, 23 marzo 2001, Istituto Italiano di Cultura, Freon Ensemble
 "Ritorna" per violoncello con sordina di legno, vibrafono con archetto e tamburo in re (o darabukka) (2001) (8’). Lucca, 15 giugno 2001, Associazione Musicale Lucchese,
 "Concerto per violoncello e doppia orchestra" (2001–2002) (40’) Commissione dell’Accademia di Santa Cecilia – Fondazione, Roma 30 novembre 2002, Accademia di Santa Cecilia,  Enrico Dindo, violoncello, direttore Stefan Anton Reck
 "Madrigale guerriero e amoroso", per sei voci e sei strumenti cinesi di tradizione, su testo di Francesco Petrarca (2002) (12’) (anche in versione per sei voci a cappella s., s., c., t., b., b.). Melbourne, 30 Ostober 2002, Melbourne Festival, The Song Company-Sidney e Hong Kong Virtuosi, direttore Roland Peelman (Edizioni Nuova Stradivarius) (Disco Stradivarius 33858)
 "Concerto per pianoforte e orchestra" (2003) (26’) Torino, 10 giugno 2003, Accademia Stefano Tempia, Francesco Cipolletta, pianoforte, direttore Massimo Peiretti
 Note del tuono per violoncello e clavicembalo (2003) (6’) Palermo, 25 maggio 2003, Anna Damiani, clavicembalo, Francesco Dillon, violoncello
 Terzo Trio (note del tuono) per violino, violoncello e pianoforte preparato con fogli di carta Zagrabia, 20 aprile 2007, Biennale, Trio Debussy
 Pasi but but per elettronica (2003) (4’) Cagliari, Spazio Musica, 7 giugno 2003
 Anna e Davide, opera da camera per bambini attori e cantori, attrice, attore, chitarra e violoncello da pagine di diari di bambini deportati nei Lager (libretto dell’autore) (50’) (2003) Casale Monferrato, 14 settembre 2003, Sinagoga, L’Opera dei Ragazzi, Erica Patrucco, violoncello, Oscar Casares, chitarra
 Notturno (Wasserklavier II) per fl. (e fl. in sol), cl.basso, v.no., vlc., pianoforte preparato con fogli di carta (2003) (14’) Bologna, 7 febbraio 2004, Accademia Filarmonica, Ensemble dell’Associazione Musicale Lucchese, direttore Fabio Neri
 Vago, vago augelletto per Di-zi (fl.cinese), Sheng (organo a bocca cinese) e trio d’archi (2003) (6’) Caraglio, 11 dicembre 2003 Il Filatoio, The Hong Kong Virtuosi e Trio Xenia
 Un dragone in gabbia, opera per attore, sei voci madrigalistiche, gruppi di strumenti ed elettronica (libretto dell’autore, dai Pisan Cantos di Ezra Pound nella versione di Mary de Rachewiltz) (2004) (85’) Torino, 20 maggio 2004, Piccolo Regio, Syryn Ensemble- Stoccolma, Riccardo Balbinutti, elettronica realizzata alla Technische Universität Berlin, direttore Carlo Pavese
 Canti Pisani, per quattro voci, quattro strumenti e pianoforte (testo tratto dai Pisan Cantos  di Ezra Pound nella versione italiana di Mary de Rachewiltz) (2005) (15’) Saarbrücken, Radio del Saarland, 7 maggio 2005, Neue Vocalsolisten Stuttgart (Edizioni Nuova Stradivarius) (Disco Stradivarius 33858)
 Arco, per violoncello concertante e orchestra d’archi (2006) (16’) Torino, 27 marzo 2006, Dario Destefano, violoncello, Orchestra Stefano Tempia, Massimo Peiretti, direttore
 Missa Sancti Evasii, per coro ed orchestra di strumenti barocchi (testi: Ordinarium Missae) (2007) (25’) Casale Monferrato, Duomo, 6 Ostober 2007 Coro Ruggero Maghini, Orchestra Barocca Academia Montis Regalis, direttore Claudio Chiavazza (Edizioni Nuova Stradivarius) (Disco Stradivarius 33858)
 Altre stelle, per fl. In sol, chitarra, vibrafono e tabla (o pakhawaj, o darabuqqa) (2008) (12’) Milano, Palazzina Liberty, 5 maggio 2008, Divertimento Ensemble, direttore Sandro Gorli
 Sagittario, per fl. in sol, cl.basso, violino e violoncello (2008) (3’) Terni, 7 settembre 2008, Ensemble In Canto, direttore Fabio Maestri
 Due canti antichi per violino e shamisen (2008) (9’) Osaka, 19 dicembre 2008, Saji Keizo Memorial Hall, Osaka University Nakanoshima Center, Francesco D’Orazio, violino, Rokunobu Kineya e Nobuzo Kineya, shamisen
 Canto antico per violino solo (2009) (6’)  Torino, 14 settembre 2009, Settembre Musica, Massimo Marin
 Quarto Trio (Kaddish) per violino, violoncello e pianoforte (2009) (9’) Torino, 14 settembre 2009, Settembre Musica, Teatro Gobetti, Francesco Cipolletta, pianoforte, Dario Destefano, violoncello, Massimo Marin, violino
 Musiche per il Castello del Monferrato, musica elettronica (Casale Monf., 13 ottobre 2009) (15’)
 Raga Rimirar le Stelle, per violoncello solo (Torino, 8 dicembre 2009, SS.Pietro e Paolo, Dario Destefano) (10’)
 Come una fantasia triste, per 6 violoncelli (Torino, 31 ottobre 2010, Politecnico, CelloConsort) (6’)
 Kaddish, per violoncello solo (Torino, 25 gennaio 2011, Dario Destefano, violoncello) (4')
 "Laudate pueri" per coro di voci bianche (2011) (5')
 Tehillah per sei voci (2013) (5') (Torino, Festival Laudes Paschales Aprile 2013, Ensemble Vocale Resonare – Marco Chiappero)
 "Concerto triplo per violino, viola, violoncello e orchestra" (2015/16) (25') (Torino, 21/3/2016, Massimo Marin – violino, Maurizio Redegoso Kharitian – viola, Dario Destefano – violoncello,  Orchestra dell'Accademia Stefano Tempia, direttore Guido Guida)
 Eine Veränderung (2016) (3') (inedito) per cl., fg., cr., p.fte, quartetto d'archi, Milano, 18/1/2017, Divertimento Ensemble, direttore Sandro Gorli
 Hallelujah per Gilberto Bosco per pianoforte  (2016) (3') (inedito) Torino, 3/12/2017, Cecilia Novarino, pianoforte
 Piccola Suite per violino e viola (2017) (12') (inedito)
 Bella, bella ciao per coro di voci giovanili a tre parti (2018) (4') (inedito) Casale Monferrato, 25/1/2018, coro L'Opera dei Ragazzi diretto da Erica Patrucco
 Fandango, dal Fandango di Antonio Soler (2019) (14') per mandolino e clavicembalo  (inedito) Milano, 5/9/2019, Anna Schivazappa, mandolino, Fabio Antonio Falcone, clavicembalo
 Trasfigurazioni e passaggi (meditazioni sullo Stabat Mater di Alessandro Scarlatti) per viola da gamba e violoncello (2019) (12')(inedito) Torino, 10/4/2019, Iris Faceto, viola da gamba, Dario Destefano, violoncello
 Quattro Rebus di Leonardo per due sassofoni (soprano e baritono) e pianoforte (2019) (7') (inedito) Saint-Jean- Cap-Ferrat, 17/8/2019, Nino Mollica, sax soprano, Enea Tonetti, sax baritono, Yanya Cohen, pianoforte
 Ouverture per orchestra (Had Gadyà Monferrina) (2019) (8') (inedito)
 Parafrasi - tre canti per voce (mezzo-soprano) e nove strumenti  (2020) (14') (inedito)
 Passaggio per violoncello e viola da gamba (1994-2020)  (7') (inedito)
 Ed or si scriva... per clarinetto di bassetto (altre versioni: clarinetto in sib e clarinetto basso)(2020) (7')  (inedito)
 Giochi con Domenico Scarlatti, un preludio, cinque interludi e un postludio per pianoforte (2020) (14') (inedito)
 Requies, per cantus firmus, due tube, quattro percussionisti, armonium, pianoforte e sound track (organo eolico Ghau Kilori) (2020) (5') (inedito)

Short Discography
 Giulio Castagnoli (disco monografico), CD Adda Records (1990)
 Al Museo in volo & a zompi (opera buffa completa), CD Nuova Fonit Cetra (1991)
 900 Musica – Elision Ensemble, CD RCA BGM/Ariola (1992)
 Giulio Castagnoli (disco monografico), CD Stradivarius (2000)
 LmcsL Messa, CD Stradivarius (2001)
 Giulio Castagnoli, Missa Sancti Evasii e musica vocale (disco monografico), CD Stradivarius(2010) The Song Company, Hong Kong Virtuosi, Syrin? Ensemble, Stockholm, Orchestra Barocca Academia Montis Regalis

Bibliography

Essays on Giulio Castagnoli's work, interviews
 Adriano Cremonese, Suono e segno: alcune note sul Quartetto 1989 di Giulio Castagnoli, in "Quaderni Perugini di Musica Contemporanea", n.25, 1989
 Gian Paolo Minardi, Comporre il mistero, in "La Gazzetta di Parma", 30 April 1992
 Luciana Galliano, Giulio Castagnoli: , in "Sonus", annoIV, nn.1/2 (May 1992)
 Susanna A. Forchino, Giulio Castagnoli – intervista, in "La musica italiana oggi: le poetiche delle ultime generazioni", tesi di laurea, Università di Torino, a.a. 1990/91
 Catia Pazzaglini, Giulio Castagnoli in "La musica oggi negli spettacoli di prosa", Tesi di Laurea, Università di Urbino (a.a. 1993/94)
 Angela Ida De Benedictis, Quattro poemetti, in "Di nuovo musica", Reggio Emilia 1997
 Martin Wilkening, Giulio Castagnoli, «DAAD Letter», n.2, Bonn 1999
 Anna Maria Morazzoni, «The New Growe Dictionary of Music & Musicians», vol. 2, 2000
 Angela Ida De Benedictis, Giulio Castagnoli, in MGG, vol.3, 2000
 Rita Gaiozzi, Il violoncello solo nella musica contemporanea, tesi di laurea, Università di Pisa (a.a. 2000/01)
 Alberto Bosco, Il mio concerto per pianoforte, tradizione popolare trasfigurata, in: Sistema Musica, anno V, n.6/2003
 Alberto Bosco,  Castagnoli: Pound, un dragone in gabbia, in Sistema Musica, anno VI, n.5/2004
 Mirco Rizzotto, Al Museo in volo e a zompi, tesi di laurea, Università di Torino- Multidams (a.a. 2005/06)
 Guido Viale, Intervista a C.Castagnoli, in: Mosaico – C.E.M., 20 December 2005

Essays and books by Giulio Castagnoli

Books
 Al Museo in volo e a zompi (con Ugo Nespolo), Milano, Nuova ERI, 1989
 Klang und Prozess in den Quattro pezzi per orchestra(1959) von Giacinto Scelsi, Saarbrücken, Pfau Verlag, 1995
 Trasparenze (con Marco Gastini), Milano, Vanni Scheiwiller Editore, 1998
 Le forme della musica, Casale Monferrato, Edizioni Sonda, 2009

Essays
 Gesto, figura, nostalgia, in "I quaderni della Scuola Civica di Musica di Milano", n.13, December 1986
 Il compositore d’oggi e la musica per banda, in "Piemonte Musicale", n.2, II Semestre 1986
 Suono e processo nei Quattro pezzi per orchestra (1959) di Giacinto Scelsi, in "Quaderni di Musica Nuova ", n.1, Torino 1987
 Portrait, note su Franco Donatoni, in "Quaderni di Musica Nuova", n.2, Torino 1988
 Un Adieu, in "MusikTexte", n.26, Ottobre 1988
 La scrittura del suono, in "Quaderni Perugini di Musica Contemporanea", n.33, 1989
 Note a Paolo Castaldi, in "Quaderni di Musica Nuova", n.3, Torino 1989
 Il percorso dei "Quaderni di Musica Nuova" di Torino, in "Sonus", anno II, n.4 (1990)
 Riflessioni sulla musica alla radio, in "Sonus", anno V, n.3/4 (1993)
 Giulio Castagnoli – uno sguardo al futuro, tavola rotonda di Sonus, in "Sonus", anno VI, n.1 (1994)
 La conscience aigüe – note sullo scriver musica oggi, in La conscience aigue, "Quaderni di Musica Nuova", nn.4/5, Torino 1994.
 Cloches en noir et blanc, Tre poesie T’ang, in "L’ora di là del tempo", catalogo 46.a Biennale di Venezia, Ricordi 1995
 L’attesa, l’ascolto, il richiamo. Un’interpretazione di alcuni canti schumanniani, in I Lieder di Schumann, "Quaderni di Musica Nuova" n.6, Torino 1996
 A proposito di Three pieces for piano di Brian Ferneyhough, in "Catalogo del Concorso Pianistico "Micheli", Milano 1997
 I compositori romantici e quelli d’oggi, in " L’indice ", giugno 1998
 La musica vera, in "Nc news, bollettino di Nuova Consonanza", ottobre 1998
 Berio, il tempo e l’armonia, in Enzo Restagno (ed.) "Sequenze per Luciano Berio", Milano, Ricordi, 2000
 G. Kurtág: un ritratto per frammenti, in G. Castagnoli (ed.), "Materiali per leggere Kurtag", Torino 2001
 Gilberto Bosco, voce della M.G.G., Baerenreiter Verlag, 2001
 Paolo Castaldi, voce della M.G.G., Baerenreiter Verlag, 2001
 Sergio Liberovici, voce della M.G.G., Baerenreiter Verlag, 2002
 La lezione di Scelsi, Il Giornale della Musica, gennaio 2005
 , 28 October 2005
 Musica scritta o musica orale? le riflessioni di un compositore, Sistema Musica, anno VII  n.10/2005

Music editions
Giulio Castagnoli's works are published by:
 BMG-Ricordi, Milano
 Edizioni Suvini Zerboni, Milano
 Casa Musicale Sonzogno, Milano
 Edipan, Roma

References

1958 births
Italian classical composers
Italian male classical composers
Hochschule für Musik Freiburg alumni
Living people